Tarpons are fish of the genus Megalops. They are the only members of the family Megalopidae. Of the two species, one (M. atlanticus) is native to the Atlantic, and the other (M. cyprinoides) to the Indo-Pacific Oceans.

Species and habitats 
The two species of tarpons are M. atlanticus (Atlantic tarpon) and  M. cyprinoides (Indo-Pacific tarpon). M. atlanticus is found on the western Atlantic coast from Virginia to Brazil, throughout the Caribbean and the coast of the Gulf of Mexico. Tarpons are also found along the eastern Atlantic coast from Senegal to South Angola. M. cyprinoides is found along the eastern African coast, throughout Southeast Asia, Japan, Tahiti, and Australia. Both species are found in both marine and freshwater habitats, usually ascending rivers to access freshwater marshes. They are able to survive in brackish water, waters of varying pH, and habitats with low dissolved  content due to their swim bladders, which they use primarily to breathe. They are also able to rise to the surface and take gulps of air, which gives them a short burst of energy. The habitats of tarpons vary greatly with their developmental stages. Stage-one larvae are usually found in clear, warm, oceanic waters, relatively close to the surface. Stage-two and -three larvae are found in salt marshes, tidal pools, creeks, and rivers. Their habitats are characteristically warm, shallow, dark bodies of water with sandy mud bottoms. Tarpons commonly ascend rivers into fresh water. As they progress from the juvenile stage to adulthood, they move back to the open waters of the ocean, though many remain in freshwater habitats.

Fossil species

Fossils of this genus go back to the Cretaceous during the Albian stage 113.0 million years ago (Mya).

 M. priscus (Woodward 1901): A species from the Ypresian stage of the Eocene, 56-47 Mya.
 M. oblongus (Woodward 1901): A species also from the Ypresian stage of the Eocene, 56-47 Mya. It lived in England along with M. priscus.
 M. vigilax (Jordan 1927): A fossil species from California dating to the Miocene.

Physical characteristics 

They have dorsal and anal soft rays and bluish or greenish backs. Tarpons possess shiny, silvery scales that cover most of their bodies, excluding the head. They have large eyes with adipose eyelids and broad mouths with prominent lower jaws that jut out farther than the rest of the face.

Reproduction and lifecycle 

Tarpons breed offshore in warm, isolated areas. Females have high fecundity and can lay up to 12 million eggs at once. Spawning usually occurs in late spring to early summer. Their three distinct levels of development usually occur in varying habitats. Stage one, or the leptocephalus stage, is completed after 20–30 days. It takes place in clear, warm oceanic waters, usually within 10–20 m of the surface. The leptocephalus shrinks as it develops into a larva; the most shrunken larva, stage two, develops by day 70. This is due to a negative growth phase followed by a sluggish growth phase. By day 70, the juvenile growth phase (stage three) begins and the fish begins to grow rapidly until reaching sexual maturity.

Diet 

Stage-one developing tarpons do not forage for food, but instead absorb nutrients from seawater using integumentary absorption. Stage-two and -three juveniles feed primarily on zooplankton, but also on insects and small fish. As they progress in juvenile development, especially those developing in freshwater environments, their consumption of insects, fish, crabs, and grass shrimp increases. Adults are strictly carnivorous and feed on midwater prey; they hunt nocturnally and swallow their food whole.

Predation 

The main predators of Megalops during stage-one and early stage-two development are other fish, depending on their size. Juveniles are subject to predation by other juvenile Megalops and piscivorous birds. They are especially vulnerable to birds such as ospreys or other raptors when they come to the surface for air, due to the rolling manner in which they move to take in air, as well as the silver scales lining their sides. Adults occasionally fall prey to sharks, porpoises, crocodiles, and alligators.

Swim bladder 

One of the unique features of Megalops is the swim bladder, which, in addition to controlling the buoyancy, can be used as an accessory respiratory organ. It arises dorsally from the posterior pharynx, and the respiratory surface is coated with blood capillaries with a thin epithelium over the top. This is the basis of the alveolar tissue found in the swim bladder, and is believed to be one of the primary methods by which  Megalops "breathes". These fish are obligate air breathers, and will die if not given sufficient access to the surface. The exchange of gas occurs at the surface through a rolling motion that is commonly associated with tarpon sightings. This "breathing" is believed to be mediated by visual cues, and the frequency of breathing is inversely correlated to the dissolved  content of the water in which they live.

Megalops and humans 

Tarpons are considered to be some of the greatest saltwater game fishes, prized not only because of their great size, but also because of the fight they put up and their spectacular leaping ability. After the International Game Fish Association took responsibility for fly fishing records in salt water (1978) fly fishing for tarpon became increasingly popular, despite declining populations (correlated with the decline of fresh water rivers flowing into the seas around Florida.) Tarpon meat is not desirable, so most are released after being caught. Numerous tournaments around the year are focused on catching tarpon.

The Atlantic tarpon adapts well to water bodies in urban and suburban environments due to their tolerance for boat traffic and low water quality. Around humans, Atlantic tarpon are primarily nocturnal. In Bonaire, they use light produced by Scuba divers to hunt at night.

Geographical distribution and migration
Since tarpons are not commercially valuable as a food fish, very little has been documented concerning their geographical distribution and migrations. They inhabit both sides of the Atlantic Ocean, and their range in the eastern Atlantic has been reliably established from Senegal to the Congo. Tarpons inhabiting the western Atlantic are principally found to populate warmer coastal waters primarily in the Gulf of Mexico, Florida, and the West Indies. Nonetheless, tarpons are regularly caught by anglers at Cape Hatteras and as far north as Nova Scotia, Bermuda, and south to Argentina. Scientific studies indicate that schools of tarpons have routinely migrated through the Panama Canal from the Atlantic to the Pacific and back for over 70 years. However, they have not been found to breed in the Pacific Ocean. Nevertheless, anecdotal evidence by tarpon fishing guides and anglers would tend to validate this notion, as over the last 60 years, many small juvenile tarpons, as well as mature giants, have been caught and documented principally on the Pacific side of Panama at the Bayano River, the Gulf of San Miguel and its tributaries, Coiba Island in the Gulf of Chiriquí, and Piñas Bay in the Gulf of Panama. Since tarpons tolerate wide ranges of salinity throughout their lives and eat almost anything dead or alive, their migrations seemingly are only limited by water temperatures.

References

External links

 Bonefish and Tarpon Trust
 Save the Tarpon
 Tarpon Geographical Distribution and Migration